Lencho Skibba (born 18 February 1988 in Dire Dawa) is an Ethiopian football midfielder.

Skibba began his career with USL First Division side Minnesota Thunder, and joined Kastoria F.C. in the Greek Beta Ethniki for the 2007–08 season.

Skibba played youth football in Ethiopia until he was adopted by German parents in 2003. He played in the youth system for Alemannia Aachen until 2007, when he moved to the United States and joined the Minnesota Thunder.

References

1988 births
Living people
Ethiopian footballers
Ethiopia international footballers
Minnesota Thunder players
German people of Ethiopian descent
German sportspeople of African descent
Sportspeople of Ethiopian descent
Expatriate soccer players in the United States
Kastoria F.C. players
Association football midfielders
Sportspeople from Dire Dawa
Oromo people
People from Oromia Region